The following list includes notable people from the city of Nablus.

Modern era

Awni Abd al-Hadi - 20th century Palestinian politician
Rabab Abdulhadi (born 1955), Palestinian-born American scholar, activist, educator, editor, and an academic director.
Hani Awijan - former head of the Palestinian Islamic Jihad militant group in Nablus
Nasib al-Bitar - former Islamic court judge
Izzat Darwaza - Palestinian Arab nationalist leader in early 20th century
Aziz Dweik - Speaker of the Palestinian Legislative Council
Mohamed Ali Eltaher - Palestinian journalist and newspaper editor
Fadi Kafisha - former head of Tanzim militant group in Nablus
Sahar Khalifeh - Palestinian writer
Munib Masri - Palestinian billionaire
Ahmed Sheikh - editor-in-chief of Al-Jazeera
Ahmad Toukan - late Prime Minister and educator
Fadwa Touqan - Palestinian poet
Fawwaz Tuqan - writer, professor and former minister
Ibrahim Touqan - Palestinian poet
Abdel Wael Zwaiter - translator

Pre-modern period

Ibn al-Sal'us, a 13th-century merchant and Mamluk vizier
Justin Martyr, second century Christian apologist
Muhammad ibn Ahmad al-Nabulusi - anti-Fatimid rebel who moved to Baniyas to continue his agitation against the Fatimid Caliphate
Yoseph ben Ab-Hisda ben Yaacov ben Aaharon - former Samaritan high priest

References

People from Nablus
Nablus